Westland Row is a street on the Southside of Dublin, Ireland.

Location 
The street runs along the east end of Trinity College Dublin.

History 

Westland Row first appears on maps in 1776. It was originally known as Westlands after William Westland who owned property in the area in the 18th century.

The Free State Intelligence Department was based at Oriel House.

Writer Oscar Wilde was born at 21 Westland Row, and future President of Ireland Mary Robinson and her four brothers lived there during their time as students. It is now home of the Oscar Wilde Centre.

Many research departments and Schools associated with Trinity, such as the Hitachi Dublin Laboratory and the Trinity School of Pharmacy, maintain administrative offices on the west side of the street. The eastern side of the street is dominated by Pearse Station, formerly called Westland Row Station, and the Church of St. Andrew. The Royal Irish Academy of Music is also based on the street.

The eponymous CBS Westland Row school backs onto the street, although the school entrance is on Cumberland Street.

See also

List of streets and squares in Dublin

References

Streets in Dublin (city)